Mahmudabad-e Olya may refer to:
 Mahmudabad-e Olya, Fasa, Fars Province
 Mahmudabad-e Olya, Marvdasht, Fars Province
 Mahmudabad-e Olya, Kohgiluyeh and Boyer-Ahmad
 Mahmudabad-e Olya, Razavi Khorasan
 Mahmudabad-e Olya, West Azerbaijan